The Zhaojun Tomb, located by the Da Hi River nine kilometers south of Hohhot, Inner Mongolia, is said to be the resting place of Wang Zhaojun, a commoner woman from the Han dynasty who married a Xiongnu Chanyu, nomadic chieftain from the steppes. The tomb is also referred to by its Mongolian name, Temür Urkhu, meaning "Iron Wall". Another nickname, "Green Mound", refers to a legend that in autumn, when grass and trees wither, those plants on the cemetery mound continue to prosper.

The tomb, one of the major attractions in the city of Hohhot, occupies some 13,000 m2 of land, with a 33-metre mound containing Zhaojun's coffin. The tomb is honorary, Wang Zhaojun is not actually buried here. Her true grave and cause of death is unknown. Still the "tomb" is visited by thousands of Chinese tourists each year and is noted for its attractive scenery.

The first Chinese mention of the cemetery in written record is in the Tang Dynasty, by Du You in A Comprehensive Guide. Former Chinese head of state Dong Biwu wrote the inscription on the entrance plaque to the tomb.

External links 
 English info

Archaeological sites in China
Buildings and structures in Inner Mongolia
Tombs in China